Interstate 49 (I-49) is an Interstate Highway in the state of Arkansas. There are two main sections of the highway across different sides of the state. The southern section starts at the Louisiana state line, then runs to Texarkana, at the Texas state line. The northern section begins at I-40 and at U.S. Highway 71 (US 71) in Alma and runs north to the Missouri state line, where the freeway continues into Missouri.

Route description
I-49 enters the state from Louisiana between Ida and Doddridge. The first interchange in Arkansas is with US 71 at exit 4. The Interstate passes near the town of Fouke, where it has another interchange with US 71. The highway enters Texarkana and has an interchange with Highway 151 and runs along the eastern portion of the Texarkana Loop. Between US 82 and US 67, I-49 passes near the Texarkana Regional Airport. The Interstate has an interchange with I-30 before leaving Texarkana. I-49 turns to the west near the Sanderson Lane exit. The Interstate terminates at US 59/US 71. In the Texarkana area, I-49 is known as the Hickerson Freeway, named after Prissy Hickerson.

It goes through the Ozark Mountains and crosses several large gorge bridges. Just north of the Crawford–Washington county line is the Bobby Hopper Tunnel which is the only large highway tunnel in Arkansas. Notable cities along the route are Fayetteville, Springdale, Rogers, and Bentonville. From I-40 north to Fayetteville, I-49 runs roughly parallel to US 71. Just south of Fayetteville, I-49 combines with US 71 and US 62, forming the major expressway through the northwest Arkansas metro area. US 71 separates from I-49 just south of the Bentonville–Bella Vista city line, where it continues northwest into and through Bella Vista as Bella Vista Way, the city's main thoroughfare. I-49 instead continues westward then northward known as the Bella Vista Bypass, running just to the south and west of the city before continuing into Missouri.

History

The first portion of I-49 was completed in the late 1990s and was opened to Mountainburg as AR 540. On January 8, 1999, the road was fully opened to traffic and was redesignated part of an extension of I-540, with the name "John Paul Hammerschmidt Highway", in honor of a former US Representative from Arkansas. Having been planned since the early 1970s, it created a bypass for the older US 71. The state of Arkansas had originally asked the American Association of State Highway and Transportation Officials (AASHTO) to allow this extension, between Fort Smith and Bentonville as I-49, to emphasize plans to extend the route from Shreveport, Louisiana, through Arkansas to Kansas City, Missouri. AASHTO refused, and the route instead opened in 1999 as a northern extension of I-540. However, this route would eventually be redesignated as I-49 in 2014. The exit numbers are still numbered from when it was I-540. From AR 72 (exit 88) to AR 16 (exit 62), the highway was upgraded to a 6-lane freeway (3 lanes in each direction).

AHTD conducted a feasibility study of adding an interchange at AR 162 in Van Buren in 1991, with the results adopted by the Arkansas State Highway Commission in 1992. The Arkansas State Highway Commission (ASHC) studied a designation for I-540 between Mountainburg and Fayetteville as an Arkansas Scenic Byway in a meeting on November 17, 1998. One of the requirements of designation is "an active organization composed of various private and governmental groups, businesses, and agencies who are interested in preservation, enhancement, marketing, and development of the route's scenic, cultural, recreational, and historic qualities". The ASHC deemed that, since the highway was a new location route, it did not have sufficient businesses to satisfy the requirement, so the ASHC deemed itself a partner organization and proceeded with a designation study. The route was added to the scenic byway system the following year.

I-49 between I-30 and US 71 was finished in May 2013. The route to the Louisiana border was completed and opened on November 10, 2014. The route to the Missouri border was completed and opened on October 1, 2021.

Arkansas Highway 549

Highway 549 (AR 549) is a temporary designation the Arkansas Department of Transportation (ArDOT) is currently using to designate opened sections of freeway that have not yet officially become part of I-49. There are three instances in which ArDOT has used this designation.

The first section of road to be designated as AR 549 is now the section of I-49 in the southern part of the state. AR 549 was first opened to traffic in December 2004 as a  route between Texarkana and Fouke. A second section, between Fouke and Doddridge, opened on October 21, 2005. A third section between Arkansas Boulevard in Texarkana and US 71 north of Texarkana opened on May 15, 2013.

The second section of road to be designated as AR 549 was the Bella Vista Bypass in the northern part of the state. The Bella Vista Bypass was first opened to traffic on April 22, 2014, as a  two-lane expressway bypassing Hiwasse, now part of the town of Gravette. The route was eventually extended to Rocky Dell Hollow Road west of Bella Vista on May 13, 2015, and I-49/US 71 in Bentonville in 2017 with ribbon cutting on May 10, 2017. A roundabout was added. The Bella Vista Bypass was planned to be expanded to four lanes, connect directly into I-49 at its south end, and extend north into Missouri, having an interchange with Missouri Route 90 and rejoining I-49 near Pineville, Missouri. The groundbreaking on the final section between Rocky Dell Hollow Road and the Missouri state line occurred on October 15, 2019. The bypass opened to traffic on October 1, 2021, following a ceremonial ribbon cutting on September 30, per ArDOT. With that, I-49 is now continuous from Kansas City, Missouri, to Fort Smith, Arkansas. Additionally, as part of the project, the interchange with US 71/U.S. Highway 71 Business (US 71B) on the southern end of the  bypass was reconstructed from a trumpet interchange into a single-point urban interchange, the first interchange of its type in Arkansas. The interchange was temporarily reconfigured as a roundabout interchange during construction on the bypass. The roundabout that opened in 2017 was removed.  The existing Bella Vista Bypass was upgraded to a four-lane highway.

The third section of road to be designated as AR 549 is a  orphaned section bypassing Fort Smith. The section, which runs between US 71 and AR 22 and AR 255, opened to traffic following a ribbon-cutting ceremony on July 14, 2015.

Future 
Eventually, I-49 will cross the entire state. It will eventually reach De Queen, Arkansas, in the near future. It will then run near the western border of the state from De Queen to Fort Smith and will run parallel to US 71. 

This stretch has been broken down into several smaller sections: the southernmost section from the Louisiana state line to Doddridge (already completed and opened), Doddridge to the Arkansas–Texas state line (eventually completed on November 10, 2014), the US 71 relocation (planned project, one  part opened in 2015 as AR 549), an approximately  stretch near Fort Smith (now in the planning stages), and part of I-540 (previously completed in 1999 and later signed as I-49 in June 2014).

The stretch near Fort Smith is now funded because voters passed Issue 1, the Connecting Arkansas Program (permanent extension of 0.5-cent road tax approved in 2012). It would have lasted for ten years (until June 30, 2023). At that time, it raised $1.8 billion. The annual impact for one year: an estimated $300 million. To finish I-49 in 10 years (assuming up to 90 percent federal match), $270 million ($27 million annually) would be needed. Construction on Arkansas River bridge near Barling is planned to occur in 2024. The estimated cost of this stretch is at $787 million, including the bridge over the Arkansas River ($300–$400 million). This segment needs to be reevaluated because the approval was issued in December 1997 and has since essentially expired. This likely means that the section from Fort Smith to Texarkana (approved at the same time also) will also need to be reevaluated. This may be built two lanes at a time.

In July 2021, ArDOT announced that they will be progressing to the next phase of development on the  segment between AR 22 in Barling (project start point) and I-49 in Alma (project end point). The segment will connect to the existing AR 549 on the northern end. Groundbreaking began on October 13, 2022, on the proposed southern extension of Future I-49 with construction expected to occur 2024 or 2025 and should be completed by the end of 2029. Phase 1 will be from AR 22 to H Street. Phase 2 will be from H Street to I-40. In 2022, some studies to reduce the cost was made. The height of the planned bridge was shortened. The new roadway will open as a 4-lane meaning it can designated as I-49. In addition, the existing roadway designated as AR 549 will be renamed as I-49. The department is also cooperating with the Federal Highway Administration (FHWA) on this project. ArDOT has mentioned that, after this project, they may work on extending to I-49 southward to Y City.

Exit list

See also

Boston Mountains Scenic Loop

Notes

References

External links

49
 Arkansas
Interstate 49
Interstate 49
Interstate 49
Interstate 49
Interstate 49